September is the ninth month of the year in both the Julian and Gregorian calendars, the third of four months to have a length of 30 days, and the fourth of five months to have a length of fewer than 31 days. September in the Northern Hemisphere and March in the Southern Hemisphere are seasonally equivalent.

In the Northern hemisphere, the beginning of the meteorological autumn is on 1 September. In the Southern hemisphere, the beginning of the meteorological spring is on 1 September.　

September marks the beginning of the ecclesiastical year in the Eastern Orthodox Church. It is the start of the academic year in many countries of the northern hemisphere, in which children go back to school after the summer break, sometimes on the first day of the month.

September (from Latin septem, "seven") was originally the seventh of ten months in the oldest known Roman calendar, the calendar of Romulus , with March (Latin Martius) the first month of the year until perhaps as late as 451 BC. After the calendar reform that added January and February to the beginning of the year, September became the ninth month but retained its name. It had 29 days until the Julian reform, which added a day.

September events 
Ancient Roman observances for September include Ludi Romani, originally celebrated from September 12 to September 14, later extended to September 5 to September 19. In the 1st century BC, an extra day was added in honor of the deified Julius Caesar on 4 September. Epulum Jovis was held on September 13. Ludi Triumphales was held from September 18–22. The Septimontium was celebrated in September, and on December 11 on later calendars. These dates do not correspond to the modern Gregorian calendar. 

September was called "harvest month" in Charlemagne's calendar. September corresponds partly to the Fructidor and partly to the Vendémiaire of the first French republic. September is called Herbstmonat, harvest month, in Switzerland. The Anglo-Saxons called the month Gerstmonath, barley month, that crop being then usually harvested.

In 1752, the British Empire adopted the Gregorian calendar. In the British Empire that year, September 2 was immediately followed by September 14.

On Usenet, it is said that September 1993 (Eternal September) never ended.

September in astronomy and astrology 
The September equinox takes place in this month, and certain observances are organized around it. It is the Autumn equinox in the Northern Hemisphere, and the Vernal equinox in the Southern Hemisphere. The dates can vary from 21 September to 24 September (in UTC).

September is mostly in the sixth month of the astrological calendar (and the first part of the seventh), which begins at the end of March/Mars/Aries.

September symbols 
 September's birthstone is the sapphire.

The birth flowers for September are the forget-me-not, morning glory and aster.
 The zodiac signs for the month of September are Virgo (until September 22) and Libra (September 23 onwards).

Observances 
This list does not necessarily imply either official status or general observance.

Non-Gregorian observances: 2020 dates 

List of observances set by the Bahá'í calendar
List of observances set by the Chinese calendar
List of observances set by the Hebrew calendar
List of observances set by the Islamic calendar
List of observances set by the Solar Hijri calendar

Month-long observances 
Amerindian Heritage Month (Guyana)
Childhood Cancer Awareness Month (United Kingdom)
Gynecologic Cancer Awareness Month
Leukemia and Lymphoma Awareness Month
Ovarian Cancer Awareness Month
Thyroid Cancer Awareness Month
National Suicide Prevention Month

United States observances 
 Better Breakfast Month
 Food Safety Education Month
 National Childhood Obesity Awareness Month
 Hydrocephalus Awareness Month
 Pain Awareness Month
 National Preparedness Month 
 National Prostate Health Month
 National Sickle Cell Awareness Month
 National Yoga Month

Food Months 
 National Bourbon Heritage Month 
 California Wine Month
 National Chicken Month
 National Honey Month
 National Mushroom Month
 National Italian Cheese Month 
 National Papaya Month
 National Potato Month
 National Rice Month
 National Whole Grains Month
 National Wild Rice Month

Movable Gregorian observances 
Engineering Day (Egypt)
White Balloon Day
Day of the Programmer
Te Wiki o te Reo Māori (Māori Language Week) (New Zealand)
See also Movable Western Christian observances
See also Movable Eastern Christian observances

First Wednesday 
Administrative Professionals' Day (South Africa)

First Thursday 
Engineer's Days (Tanzania)

First Friday 
Engineer's Days (Tanzania)
Labor Day (Marshall Islands)
Teachers' Day (Singapore)

First Sunday 
Brazilian Day (International observance)
Father's Day (Australia, Fiji, New Zealand, Papua New Guinea)
Memorial of the Holy Guardian Angels (Roman Catholic Church, October 2 in most locations, first Sunday in September by special dispensation)

First Sunday after September 4 
Wakes Week (Parts of England and Scotland) 
Abbots Bromley Horn Dance (Abbots Bromley, Staffordshire, England)

Week of the First Monday 
National Payroll Week (United States, Canada, United Kingdom)

Week of September 10 
National Suicide Prevention Week (United States)

First Monday 
Labour Day (Canada, Palau, United States)

Nearest weekday to September 12 
Saragarhi Day (Sikhism)
Patriot Day (United States)

Second Saturday 
Day of the Workers in the Oil, Gas, Power, and Geological Industry (Turkmenistan)

Saturday after first Monday 
Carl Garner Federal Lands Cleanup Day (United States)

Second Sunday 
Auditor's Day (Church of Scientology)
Father's Day (Latvia) 
National Grandparents' Day (Canada, Estonia) 
Tanker's Day (Russia) 
Turkmen Bakhshi Day (Turkmenistan)

First Sunday after first Monday 
National Grandparents' Day (United States)

Week of September 17 
Celebrate Freedom Week (Kansas and Texas, United States)

Third Tuesday 
Prinsjesdag (Netherlands)

September 17 but observed on previous Friday if it falls on a Saturday or following Monday if on a Sunday 
Constitution Day (United States)

Third Friday 
National POW/MIA Recognition Day (United States)

Third Saturday 
National Cleanup Day (United States)
Oktoberfest celebrations begin (German diaspora, local dates may vary)
Software Freedom Day (International observance)

Weekend of the week of September 17 
Von Steuben Day (United States)

Third Sunday 
Day of the Walloon Region (Wallonia, Belgium) 
Father's Day (Ukraine)
Federal Day of Thanksgiving, Repentance and Prayer (Switzerland) 
Warachikuy (Cusco, Peru)

Week of Sunday before September 23 
Bisexual Awareness Week

Week of September 22 
Tolkien Week

Last week 
Banned Books Week (International observance):

Last full week 
National Forest Week (Canada)
National Tree Day (Wednesday of last full week): 
Celebrate Freedom Week (Arkansas and Florida, United States)

Third Monday 
Respect for the Aged Day (Japan)

Observances pertaining to the September Equinox 
Autumnal Equinox Day (Japan)
French Republican New Year. (defunct) 
Guldize (Cornish people) 
Higan (Japan)
Mabon (Neopaganism, Northern Hemisphere)
Miķeļi (Latvia)
Ostara  (Neopaganism, Southern Hemisphere)

Fourth Friday 
Native American Day (California, United States)

Last Friday 
Manit Day (Marshall Islands)

Last Saturday 
Girls in Aviation Day (International observance)
National Public Lands Day (United States)

Last Sunday 
Daylight saving time begins (New Zealand)
Gold Star Mother's Day (United States)

Fourth Monday 
American Indian Day (Tennessee, United States)
September Declaration (Flanders, Belgium)

Last Wednesday 
Maple Leaf Day (Canada)

Last weekday in September 
Ask a Stupid Question Day (India, United Kingdom, United States)

Fixed Gregorian observances 
September 1
Anniversary of the Start of the Armed Struggle (Eritrea)
Constitution Day (Slovakia)
Disaster Prevention Day (Japan)
Emma Nutt Day (International observance)
First day of school in many countries in Asia, Europe and the Americas.
Flag Day (Honduras)
Independence Day (Uzbekistan)
Journalist Day (Taiwan)
Knowledge Day (Russia, Ukraine and Armenia)
National Cherry Popover Day (United States)
Random Acts of Kindness Day (New Zealand)
Start of National Arbor Week (South Africa), September 1–7
Veteran's Day (Poland)
Teachers' Day (Singapore)
Wattle Day (Australia)
September 2
Democracy Day (Tibet)
Independence Day (Transnistria, unrecognized)
Independence Day (Nagorno-Karabakh Republic, unrecognized)
National Blueberry Popsicle Day (United States)
National Day (Vietnam)
Sedantag (German Empire, defunct)
Victory over Japan Day (United States)
September 3
China's victory over Japan commemoration related observances:
Armed Forces Day (Republic of China)
V-J Day (People's Republic of China)
Feast of San Marino and the Republic (Republic of San Marino)
Flag Day (Australia)
Independence Day (Qatar)
Levy Mwanawasa Day (Zambia)
Memorial Day (Tunisia)
Merchant Navy Remembrance Day (Canada)
Merchant Navy (United Kingdom)
National Welsh Rarebit Day (United States)
Tokehega Day (Tokelau, New Zealand)
September 4
Clear Day (Scientology)
Immigrant's Day (Argentina)
National Macadamia Nut Day (United States)
Newspaper Carrier Day (United States)
September 5
International Day of Charity 
National Cheese Pizza Day (United States)
Teachers' Day (India)
September 6
Armed Forces Day (São Tomé and Príncipe)
Defence Day or Army Day (Pakistan)
Flag Day (Bonaire)
Independence Day (Eswatini)
National Coffee Ice Cream Day (United States)
Unification Day (Bulgaria)
September 7
Air Force Day (Pakistan) 
Independence Day (Brazil)
Military Intelligence Day (Ukraine)
National Acorn Squash Day (United States)
National Beer Lover's Day (United States)
National Salami Day (United States)
National Threatened Species Day (Australia)
Victory Day (Mozambique)
September 8
Day of the Battle of Borodino (Russia)
Feast Day of Our Lady of Meritxell (Andorra)
Independence Day (North Macedonia)
International Literacy Day 
Martyrs' Day (Afghanistan) (date may fall on September 9, follows a non-Gregorian calendar)
National day (Andorra)
Nativity of Mary (Roman Catholic Church), (Anglo-Catholicism)
Monti Fest (Mangalorean Catholic)
Victory Day (Pakistan)
Victory Day (Malta)
World Physical Therapy Day
September 9
Armored Forces Day (Ukraine)
California Admission Day (California, United States)
Children's Day (Costa Rica)
Chrysanthemum Day (Japan)
Day of the Victims of Holocaust and of Racial Violence (Slovakia)
Emergency Services Day (United Kingdom)
Independence Day or Republic Day (North Korea)
Independence Day (Tajikistan) from USSR in 1991.
Martyrs' Day (Afghanistan) (date may fall on September 8, follows a non-Gregorian calendar)
National Steak Au Poivre Day (United States)
Remembrance for Herman the Cheruscan (The Troth)
Wienerschnitzel Day (United States)
Wonderful Weirdos Day
September 10
Amerindian Heritage Day (Guyana)
Children's Day (Honduras)
National Day (Gibraltar)
National TV Dinner Day (United States)
Saint George's Caye Day (Belize)
Teachers' Day (China)
World Suicide Prevention Day 
September 11
Battle of Tendra Day (Russia)
Death Anniversary of Quaid-e-Azam Muhammad Ali Jinnah, a former holiday. (Pakistan)
Emergency Number Day (United States)
Enkutatash falls on this day if it is not a leap year.(Ethiopia, Rastafari)
National Day of Catalonia (Catalonia)
National Hot Cross Bun Day (United States)
Nayrouz (Coptic Orthodox Church)
Patriot Day (United States)
Remember Freedom Day
Teachers' Day (Argentina)
September 12
Most Holy Name of the Blessed Virgin Mary
Day of Conception (Russia)
Day of the Programmer, during a leap year. (International)
Defenders Day (Maryland. (United States)
Enkutatash falls on this day if it is a leap year. (Ethiopia, Rastafari)
Mindfulness Day 
National Chocolate Milkshake Day (United States)
National Day (Cape Verde)
National Day of Encouragement (United States)
Saragarhi Day (Sikhism) (this day or nearest weekday, 2015 date: September 11)
September 13
Day of the Programmer, during a non-leap year. (International)
Feast of the Cross (Assyrian Church of the East)
Día de los Niños Héroes (Mexico)
Engineer's Day (Mauritius) 
International Chocolate Day
National Peanut Day (United States)
September 14
Children's Day (Nepal) (celebrated on the 15th on leap years)
Engineer's Day (Romania)
Feast of the Cross (Christianity)
Elevation of the Holy Cross (Eastern Orthodox)
Hindi Diwas (Hindi-speaking regions)
Mobilized Servicemen Day (Ukraine)
National Cream Filled Donut Day (United States)
National Eat a Hoagie Day (United States) 
San Jacinto Day (Nicaragua)
September 15
Battle of Britain Day (United Kingdom)
Children's Day (Nepal) (leap years only)
Engineer's Day (India)
Free Money Day (International)
Independence Day (Guatemala, El Salvador, Honduras, Nicaragua, and Costa Rica)
International Day of Democracy (International)
Knowledge Day (Azerbaijan)
National Crème de Menthe Day (United States)
National Double Cheeseburger Day (United States)
National Linguine Day (United States)
National Cheese Toast Day (United States)
Patriotic Day (Guatemala)
Restoration of Primorska to the Motherland Day (Slovenia)
Silpa Bhirasri Day (Thailand).
World Lymphoma Awareness Day 
The beginning of National Hispanic Heritage Month, celebrated until October 15 (United States)
September 16
Grito de Dolores (Mexico)
Independence Day (Papua New Guinea), celebrates the independence of Papua New Guinea from Australia in 1975.
International Day for the Preservation of the Ozone Layer
Malaysian Armed Forces Day (Malaysia)
Malaysia Day (Malaysia, Singapore)
Martyrs' Day (Libya)
Heroes' Day (Saint Kitts and Nevis)
National Cinnamon Raisin Toast Day (United States)
National Guacamole Day (United States)
Stay Away from Seattle Day
September 17
Australian Citizenship Day
Constitution Day (United States) (observed on the previous Friday if it falls on a Saturday, the following Monday if on a Sunday)
Start of Constitution Week, runs from September 17–23
Heroes' Day (Angola)
Marathwada Liberation Day (India)
National Apple Dumpling Day (United States)
National Monte Cristo Sandwich Day (United States)
Operation Market Garden Anniversary is still remembered with parachuting and dedications on this day. (Netherlands)
Teachers' Day (Honduras)
Von Steuben Day. (United States), weekend of the week of September 17.
September 18
Day of National Music (Azerbaijan)
First day of Fiestas Patrias (Chile) or Dieciocho (Chile)
Island Language Day (Okinawa Prefecture, Japan)
National Cheeseburger Day (United States)
Navy Day (Croatia)
World Water Monitoring Day (International)
September 19
Armed Forces Day (Chile)
Day of the First Public Appearance of the Slovak National Council
Feast of San Gennaro
Second day of Fiestas Patrias (Chile) 
Independence Day (Saint Kitts and Nevis)
International Talk Like a Pirate Day
National Butterscotch Pudding Day (United States)
September 20
Independence Day of South Ossetia (not fully recognized)
National Pepperoni Pizza Day (United States)
National Punch Day (United States)
National Rum Punch Day (United States)
National Youth Day (Thailand)
Oil Workers' Day (Azerbaijan)
Universal Children's Day (Germany)
September 21
Arbor Day (Brazil)
Commemoration of the Declaration of Martial Law (Philippines)
Customs Service Day (Poland) 
Founder's Day and National Volunteer Day (Ghana)
Independence Day, celebrates the independence of Armenia from the Soviet Union in 1991.
Independence Day, celebrates the independence of Belize from the United Kingdom in 1981.
Independence Day, celebrates the independence of Malta from the United Kingdom in 1964.
International Day of Peace (International) 
National Pecan Cookie Day (United States)
Acknowledgement of Earth, Wind, & Fire's "September"
Student's Day (Bolivia)
Victory over the Golden Horde in the Battle of Kulikovo (Russia)
September 22
American Business Women's Day (United States)
Dear Diary Day 
Hobbit Day, the containing week is celebrated as Tolkien Week. (American Tolkien Society)
Independence Day, celebrates the independence of Bulgaria from the Ottoman Empire in 1908.
Independence Day, celebrates the independence of Mali from France in 1960.
OneWebDay, an annual day of Internet celebration and awareness, started in 2006.
Resistance Fighting Day (Estonia)
World Car-Free Day
September 23 
Celebrate Bisexuality Day
Grito de Lares (Puerto Rico)
Holocaust Memorial Day (Lithuania)
Kyrgyz Language Day (Kyrgyzstan)
National Day (Saudi Arabia) 
Teachers' Day (Brunei)
September 24
Armed Forces Day (Peru)
Constitution Day (Cambodia)
La Mercè (Barcelona)
Heritage Day (South Africa)
Independence Day (Guinea-Bissau)
Mahidol Day (Thailand)
National Punctuation Day (United States)
New Caledonia Day (New Caledonia)
Republic Day (Trinidad and Tobago)
September 25
Day of National Recognition for the Harkis (France) 
German Butterbrot Day (Germany)
National Lobster Day (United States)
National Youth Day (Nauru)
Revolution Day (Mozambique)
September 26
Day of the National Flag (Ecuador)
Dominion Day (New Zealand)
European Day of Languages (European Union)
Johnny Appleseed Day (United States)
National Better Breakfast Day (United States)
National Dumpling Day (United States)
National Good Neighbor Day (United States)
National Pancake Day (United States)
Revolution Day (Yemen)
September 27
Consumación de la Independencia (Mexico)
French Community Holiday (French community of Belgium)
Meskel (Ethiopian and Eritrean Orthodox Church, following Julian calendar, September 28 on leap years)
National Chocolate Milk Day (United States)
National Corned Beef Hash Day (United States)
National Gay Men's HIV/AIDS Awareness Day (United States)
Polish Underground State's Day (Poland)
World Tourism Day 
September 28
Ask a Stupid Question Day (United States)
Czech Statehood Day (Czech Republic)
Family Day – A Day to Eat Dinner with Your Children (United States)
Fish Tank Floorshow Night
Freedom from Hunger Day 
International Right to Know Day
Meskel (Ethiopian and Eritrean Orthodox Church, September 28 on leap years only, all other years is September 27)
National Day of Awareness and Unity against Child Pornography (Philippines)
Teachers' Day (Taiwan and Chinese-Filipino schools in the Philippines) 
World Rabies Day 
September 29
 Feast of the Archangels Michael, Gabriel, and Raphael.
National Biscotti Day (United States)
National Coffee Day (multiple countries, see article)
Inventors' Day (Argentina)
Michaelmas One of the four quarter days in the Irish calendar. (England and Ireland)
Victory of Boquerón Day (Paraguay)
World Heart Day 
September 30
Agricultural Reform (Nationalization) Day (São Tomé and Príncipe)
Birth of Morelos (Mexico)
Blasphemy Day (United States, Canada, other countries)
Boy's Day (Poland)
Independence Day (Botswana)
International Translation Day (International Federation of Translators)
National Hot Mulled Cider Day (United States)
Recovery Day (Canada)
Orange Shirt Day (Canada)

References

External links 

 
09